The 1916–17 Colgate Raiders men's basketball team represented Colgate University during the 1916–17 college men's basketball season. The head coach was Walt Hammond, coaching the Raiders in his fourth season. The team had finished with a final record of 15–4. The team captain was Ben Van Alystyne.

Schedule

|-

References

Colgate Raiders men's basketball seasons
Colgate
Colgate
Colgate